Overtraining occurs when a person exceeds their body's ability to recover from strenuous exercise. Overtraining can be described as a point where a person may have a decrease in performance and plateauing as a result of failure to consistently perform at a certain level or training load; a load which exceeds their recovery capacity. People who are overtrained cease making progress, and can even begin to lose strength and fitness. Overtraining is also known as chronic fatigue, burnout and overstress in athletes. It is suggested that there are different variations of overtraining, firstly monotonous program over training suggest that repetition of the same movement such as certain weight lifting and baseball batting can cause performance plateau due to an adaption of the central nervous system which results from a lack of stimulation. A second example of overtraining is described as chronic overwork type training where the subject may be training with too high intensity or high volume and not allowing sufficient recovery time for the body. Up to 10% of elite endurance athletes and 10% of American college swimmers are affected by overtraining syndrome (unexplained underperformance for approximately 2 weeks even after having adequate resting time).

Signs and symptoms 
Listed below are some of the common effects and cited signs of overtraining.

Overtraining may be accompanied by one or more concomitant symptoms:
 Persistent muscle soreness
 Persistent fatigue, different from just being tired from a hard training session, occurs when fatigue continues even after adequate rest.
 Elevated resting heart rate, a persistently high heart rate after adequate rest such as in the morning after sleep, can be an indicator of overtraining.
 Reduced heart rate variability
 Increased susceptibility to infections
 Increased incidence of injuries
 Irritability
 Depression
 Mental breakdown
 Burnout

It is important to note the difference between overtraining and over-reaching; over-reaching is when an athlete is undergoing hard training but with adequate recovery, overtraining however, is when an athlete is undergoing hard training without the adequate recovery. With over-reaching, the consequential drop in performance can be resolved in a few days or weeks.

Performance 
 Early onset of fatigue
 Decreased aerobic capacity (VO2 max)
 Poor physical performance
 Inability to complete workouts
 Delayed recovery

Overtraining can affect the athlete's athletic ability and other areas of life, such as performance in studies or the work force. An overtrained athlete who is suffering from physical and or psychological symptoms could also have trouble socialising with friends and family, studying for an exam or preparing for work.

Cause
Like pharmacological drugs, physical exercise may be chemically addictive. Addiction can be defined as the frequent engaging in the behavior to a greater extent or for a longer time period than intended. It is theorized that this addiction is due to natural endorphins and dopamine generated and regulated by the exercise. Whether strictly due to this chemical by-product or not, some people can be said to become addicted to or fixated on psychological/physical effects of physical exercise and fitness. This may lead to over exercise, resulting in the "overtraining" syndrome.

Mechanism

A number of possible mechanisms for overtraining have been proposed. One stipulates that microtrauma to the muscles are created faster than the body can heal them. Another proposes that amino acids are used up faster than they are supplied in the diet, a condition sometimes referred to as "protein deficiency". Finally, systemic inflammation has been considered as a mechanism in which  the release of cytokines activates an excessive immune response.

Treatment 

The most effective way to treat the effects of overtraining is to allow the body enough time to recover:
 Taking a break from training to allow time for recovery.
 Reducing volume and/or intensity of training.
 Suitable periodization of training.
 Splitting the training program so that different sets of muscles are worked on different days.
 Increase sleep time.
 Deep-tissue or sports massage of the affected muscles.
 Self-massage or rub down of the affected muscles.
 Short sprints with long resting time once the athlete is able to continue with light training.

Diet 
Adapting nutritional intake can help to prevent and treat overtraining. Athletes in different fields will emphasize different proportional nutrition factors on the diet mainly including proteins, carbohydrates and fats. The diet includes a calorie intake that at least matches expenditure, ideally forming a suitable macronutrient ratio. During the recovery process, extra calories from diets may help the body speed the recovery. Finally, addressing vitamin deficiencies with improved diet and/or nutritional supplements has been proposed as a way to speed up recovery.

Rhabdomyolysis 
Exertional rhabdomyolysis is an extreme and potentially deadly form of overtraining that leads to a breakdown of skeletal muscle which makes its way into the blood. Many molecules such as potassium, creatine kinase, phosphate, and myoglobin are released into circulation. Myoglobin is the protein that causes the lethal reaction in the body. Early detection of the syndrome is essential in full recovery. A serious late complication of rhabdomyolysis which occurs in 15% of the population is acute kidney injury, and in some cases it can lead to death.

Clinical presentation 

 Muscle pain
 Tenderness
 Swelling
 Weakness
 Bruising
 Tea colored urine
 Fever
 Malaise
 Nausea
 Emesis
 Confusion
 Agitation
 Delirium
 Anuria

CrossFit and rhabdomyolysis 
As CrossFit has become more and more prevalent and popular, this has led to speculation that spikes in rhabdomyolysis cases are related to CrossFit. According to a study performed in the Journal of Strength and Conditioning Research, unless performed incorrectly and in harmful environments, CrossFit presents no serious physical threat to the human body, and research into whether rhabdomyolysis cases and CrossFit are correlated is inconclusive.

Prevention 
Passive recovery, instead of active recovery, is a form of rest that is recommended to be performed by athletes in between rigorous, intermittent exercise. With active recovery, time to exhaustion is much shorter because the muscles are deoxygenated at a much quicker rate than with passive recovery. Thus, if avoiding overtraining means preventing exhaustion, passive recovery or "static rest" is safest. If active recovery is performed during intense exercise, an athlete may find themselves in a state of being overtrained. The gradual variation of intensity and volume of training is also an effective way to prevent overtraining.

References

Exercise physiology
Weight training